Henri Leconte was the defending champion but lost in the second round this year.

Claudio Mezzadri won the title, defeating Tomáš Šmíd 6–4, 7–5 in the final.

Seeds

  Andrés Gómez (semifinals)
  Joakim Nyström (second round)
  Henri Leconte (second round)
  Guillermo Pérez Roldán (quarterfinals)
  Eduardo Bengoechea (second round)
  Ulf Stenlund (semifinals)
  Tarik Benhabiles (first round)
  Horst Skoff (first round)

Draw

Finals

Top half

Bottom half

External links
 ATP main draw

1987 in Swiss sport
1987 Grand Prix (tennis)
1987 Geneva Open